Selicanis is a genus of moths of the family Noctuidae.

Species
 Selicanis cinereola Smith, 1900

References
Natural History Museum Lepidoptera genus database
Selicanis at funet

Hadeninae